The Salt Lake Screaming Eagles were a professional indoor football team based in West Valley City, Utah, near Salt Lake City. The Screaming Eagles started as an expansion team in the Indoor Football League (IFL) and began play in 2017 with home games at the Maverik Center. The team folded when ownership left the IFL to start their own league.

History
The team was announced in April 2016 by a group called Project FANchise with the intent on creating an entirely fan operated indoor football team. The project announced that fans would vote on every aspect of the team including the name of the team, signing players, and calling plays. On June 6, the name of the team was announced as the Screaming Eagles after the 101st Airborne Division. The name was picked over the more controversial choices of "Teamy McTeamface," "Sandtroopers," and  "Stormin' Mormons." William McCarthy was voted in as the first head coach in franchise history.

The team made their debut at home against the Nebraska Danger on February 16, 2017.  They lost 78–47 in a game which featured the fans storming the field after the Eagles scored the first fan-called touchdown in franchise history.  Also, the team introduced their part-owner, Norm Macdonald, who helped call part of the game streamed live on SI.com (Sports Illustrated) and YouTube. The team won their first game the next week defeating the Colorado Crush 42–41 on February 26. On March 1, the team then fired head coach William McCarthy due to philosophical differences and then hired Matthew Sauk as its new head coach without using the fan vote system. However, the FANchise vote system made national news once again when their fans voted against signing former NFL player Greg Hardy on March 30, 2017.

On April 20, 2017, The Wall Street Journal reported that Project FANchise was planning on launching a new league called the "Interactive Football League". Project FANchise CEO Sohrob Farudi confirmed that the Screaming Eagles would finish the 2017 Indoor Football League season and would be leaving the league afterwards. The league was later re-branded as the Electronic Football League (eFL) in October 2017 and then as the Fan Controlled Football League (FCFL) in November 2017. The new league planned to play all of its games in only one city with eight new teams and the Screaming Eagles did not appear to be one the team names considered. The new league eventually began play in February 2021 as Fan Controlled Football with four teams.

Statistics and records

Season-by-season results

Head coach records

Personnel

Final roster

All-League selections
 WR Devin Mahina
 DB James Calhoun

Individual awards

Staff

2017 season

Schedule
Key:

Standings

References

External links
Official website

 
2016 establishments in Utah
2017 disestablishments in Utah